Pinnacle Peak is a remote 3,714-meter-elevation (12,184-foot) mountain summit of the Saint Elias Mountains, in Kluane National Park of Yukon, Canada. It ranks as the 37th-highest officially named mountain in Canada. It is situated at the head of the South Arm of the Kaskawulsh Glacier. Topographic relief is significant as the summit rises 1,500 meters (4,920 feet) above the Dusty Glacier in 3.5 kilometers (2.2 miles). Neighbors include Mount Kennedy, 14 km to the south, and Mount Alverstone, 14 km to the south-southwest.

Climate

Based on the Köppen climate classification, Pinnacle Peak is located in a subarctic climate zone with long, cold, winters, and short, cool summers. Winter temperatures can drop below −30 °C with wind chill factors below −50 °C. This climate supports the Kaskawulsh, Dusty, and Lowell glaciers surrounding the peak.

Climbing
The first ascent of the summit was made April 20, 1965, led by Ed Boulton, along with Alvin Randall, Ome Daiber, Dave McBrayer, Bob Booher, and Arnie Bloomer via the west ridge. In May 1974, Harry Bowron, Hugh Ewing, Kirk Keogh, and Bruce Carson made first ascents of the east and north ridges. The third ascent took place in 1990, and was the first by Canadian mountaineers, a group which included Bill McKenzie, Bill Geddes, Roger Wallis, Glynis Peters, Yan Huckendubler, Gord Gruber, and Joe Prokopiak.

See also

List of mountains of Canada
Geography of Yukon

References

External links

 Parks Canada website: Kluane
 Weather forecast

Three-thousanders of Yukon
Saint Elias Mountains
Kluane National Park and Reserve